The 1993 World Table Tennis Championships women's doubles was the 41st edition of the women's doubles championship.
Liu Wei and Qiao Yunping defeated Deng Yaping and Qiao Hong in the final by three sets to one.

Results

See also
List of World Table Tennis Championships medalists

References

-
World